Nagytőke is a village in Csongrád county, in the Southern Great Plain region of southern Hungary.

Geography

Elections 
On September 4, 2016. Csaba Szél won the mayoral election in Nagytőke, he is a member of the Jobbik party.

References

Populated places in Csongrád-Csanád County